is a Japanese footballer who plays for FC Gifu.

Club statistics
Updated to 20 December 2022.

1Includes Emperor's Cup.
2Includes J. League Cup.
3Includes Japanese Super Cup, J. League Championship and FIFA Club World Cup.

National team statistics

Honours

Club
Urawa Red Diamonds
AFC Champions League: 2017
J.League Cup: 2016
Emperor's Cup: 2018, 2021

References

External links

Tomoya Ugajin at Urawa Red Diamonds official site 
Tomoya Ugajin at Yahoo! Japan sports 

1988 births
Living people
Ryutsu Keizai University alumni
Association football people from Saitama Prefecture
Japanese footballers
J1 League players
Urawa Red Diamonds players
J3 League players
FC Gifu players
Japan international footballers
Association football defenders
Association football midfielders